The 2021 Qatar Total Open was a professional women's tennis tournament, played in Doha, Qatar between the 1st and the 6th of March 2021. The tournament was played on hard courts at the International Tennis and Squash Complex, and was a WTA 500 event on the 2021 WTA Tour. Typically played in February one to two weeks following the Australian Open, the tournament was played in March this year in order to adjust for the delayed start of the 2021 tournament, which was held three weeks later than usual due to the COVID-19 pandemic.

Champions

Singles

  Petra Kvitová def.  Garbiñe Muguruza, 6–2, 6–1.

It was Kvitová's first title of 2021 and the 28th of her career.

Doubles

  Nicole Melichar /  Demi Schuurs def.  Monica Niculescu /  Jeļena Ostapenko, 6–2, 2–6, [10–8]

Points and prize money

Point distribution

Prize money

1Qualifiers prize money is also the Round of 32 prize money.
*per team

Singles main-draw entrants

Seeds

1 Rankings determined by February 22, 2021.

Other entrants
The following players will receive wildcards into the singles main draw:
  Victoria Azarenka
  Çağla Büyükakçay
  Jeļena Ostapenko
  Mayar Sherif

The following player received entry into the singles main draw using a protected ranking:
  Zheng Saisai

The following players received entry from the qualifying draw:
  Anna Blinkova
  Jessica Pegula
  Kristýna Plíšková
  Laura Siegemund

The following player received entry as a lucky loser:
  Misaki Doi

Withdrawals
Before the tournament
  Bianca Andreescu → replaced by  Ons Jabeur
  Amanda Anisimova → replaced by  Misaki Doi
  Ashleigh Barty → replaced by  Wang Qiang
  Simona Halep → replaced by  Amanda Anisimova
  Sofia Kenin → replaced by  Anastasia Pavlyuchenkova
  Iga Świątek → replaced by  Svetlana Kuznetsova
  Markéta Vondroušová → replaced by  Zheng Saisai
During the tournament
  Victoria Azarenka

Doubles main-draw entrants

Seeds 

 Rankings determined by February 22, 2021.

Other entrants
The following pairs will receive wildcards into the doubles main draw:
  Çağla Büyükakçay /  Anastasia Pavlyuchenkova
  Laura Siegemund /  Elena Vesnina

The following pair received entry into the doubles main draw using a protected ranking:
  Andreja Klepač /  Sania Mirza

The following pair received entry as alternates:
  Akgul Amanmuradova /  Liang En-shuo

Withdrawals 
Before the tournament
  Hayley Carter /  Luisa Stefani → replaced by  Akgul Amanmuradova /  Liang En-shuo
  Xu Yifan /  Yang Zhaoxuan → replaced by  Elena Rybakina /  Yaroslava Shvedova
  Zhang Shuai /  Zheng Saisai → replaced by  Zheng Saisai /  Zhu Lin

References

External links

Qatar Total Open
Qatar Ladies Open
2021 in Qatari sport
Qatar Total Open